Paulo Rodrigues is the name of:

Paulo César Rodrigues Lima (born 1981), Brazilian footballer
Paulo Rodrigues da Silva (1986–2012), Brazilian footballer
Paulo Rodrigues (athlete)

See also
Paul Rodriguez (disambiguation) 
Paulo Rodriguez (disambiguation)